The depiction of LGBTQ characters in animated series in the 1990s changed significantly from those in previous decades. Some of the most prominent series during this decade which featured LGBTQ characters were Sailor Moon, South Park, King of the Hill, Cardcaptor Sakura and Futurama. However, Revolutionary Girl Utena stood apart, with prominent LGBTQ characters, which some called one of the most important anime of the 1990s. It heavily influenced the creator of Steven Universe, Rebecca Sugar, calling a series which "plays with the semiotics of gender" which really stuck with her. Additionally, during this decade, Family Guy and SpongeBob SquarePants premiered, with LGBTQ protagonists in both shows, although it was only implied in the latter show.

For a further understanding of how these LGBTQ characters fit into the overall history of animation, please read the History of LGBT characters in animation: 1990s page.

1990–94 

From 1990–1994, more LGBT characters appeared in anime than in Western animation. This included series such as Dear Brother, RG Veda, Sailor Moon, Ai no Kusabi, and Yu Yu Hakusho. In contrast, Gargoyles featured an array of gay, bisexual, and asexual characters. This trend would continue in the later 1990s, with more LGBTQ characters introduced in Western animation.

1995–99 

From 1995 to 1999, the number of animated series with LGBT characters dramatically increased the number of series which featured such characters during the earlier part of the decade, from 1990 to 1994. While the majority of the animated series were anime such as Dirty Pair Flash: Mission II, El-Hazard: The Wanderers, Fushigi Yûgi, Gunsmith Cats, Cardcaptor Sakura they also appeared in Western animations. This included Crapston Villas, South Park, King of the Hill, Family Guy, and Hey Arnold!, the latter confirmed many years later. However, during this time period, one animated series would influential on LGBTQ characters for years to come: Revolutionary Girl Utena. It would impact a Marylander named Rebecca Sugar, then only a cartoonist, who would later create Steven Universe, with the series sticking with her over the years. This queer anime, was groundbreaking for its time, in part because of the lesbian relationship between two of the story's protagonists: Utena Tenjou and Anthy Himemiya.

See also
 List of yuri anime and manga
 List of LGBT-related films by year
 List of animated series with crossdressing characters

References

LGBT
1990s-related lists
Animated 1990s
LGBT
 1990s
 1990s
Animated